WLQZ-LP is a broadcast radio station licensed to and serving Warsaw, Indiana, United States. As of June 2015, the station is on the air with a format of Top 40 music as Z93.9, Warsaw's Hit Music Station.  WLQZ-LP is owned and operated by Blessed Beginnings.

From LPFM to commercial
At 12:00 am on Friday, March 6, 2015, the Oldies, Classic Hits, and Classic Top 40 of LPFM station WIOE-LP moved to commercial WMYQ. WIOE-LP fell silent with the frequency change.

The station changed its call sign to WLQZ-LP on April 20, 2015, back to WIOE-LP on July 2, 2015, and back to WLQZ-LP again on July 10, 2015.

References

External links
 

2003 establishments in Indiana
Radio stations established in 2003
LQZ-LP
LQZ-LP